Wood Norton may refer to:

Wood Norton, Worcestershire, a stately home in Worcestershire, England
Wood Norton, Norfolk, a village in Norfolk, England